Sion Jones may refer to:
 Sion Jones (cyclist), Welsh racing cyclist
 Sion Jones (rugby league), Welsh rugby league player
 Sion Russell Jones, Welsh singer and songwriter